Désirée is an operetta in two acts with music by John Philip Sousa and libretto by Edward M. Taber.  The libretto was later revised and updated by Jerrold Fisher and William Martin.

Performance history
Based on the English comedy Our Wife by John Maddison Morton, it premiered on May 1, 1884 at The National Theater, Washington D.C.  It was one of the first American operettas and was billed as "America's First Comic Opera", although it was based on an English comedy set in France.  It also marked the comic opera debut of DeWolf Hopper, who sang the role of Pomaret.

Roles

Synopsis
In Amiens, France, during the time of Cardinal Richelieu, Musketeers have gathered in Pomaret’s mercer shop, seeking his beautiful daughter, Désirée.  Her cousin, Marie, waits on them and is all but ignored.  Their delightful recreation is interrupted by a trumpet call, which summons them to their military duties.

The Count de Courville arrives, dismisses Marie, and then asks Désirée for her hand in marriage.  The Count’s father, however, disapproves of his son’s marriage to a commoner and threatens by letter to imprison Pomaret if he permits the marriage to take place.  The Count’s superior officer and friend, the heroic Marquis de Lavarre, decides to offer a solution.  The Marquis proposes marriage to Désirée on the condition that the wedding takes place within the hour.  At the prospect of becoming the father of a Marchioness, Pomaret promptly gives his consent.

Unbeknown to the Count, however, the Marquis has recently been convicted of killing a rival in a duel and has been sentenced to death.  Cardinal Richelieu has condescended to permit the Marquis to die in battle against thirty-thousand Spaniards instead of facing ignominious death on the gallows. The Marquis secretly plans that as soon as the wedding vows are completed he will leave for his final battle, having first ennobled Désirée and then making the new Marchioness a widow, freeing her to marry the Count – thus fulfilling his promise to solve his friend’s dilemma.

However, the jealous Count is infuriated upon learning of the marriage plan and challenges the Marquis to a duel. In his outrange, the Count does not allow the Marquis the chance to explain. The Marquis has him arrested for his own good. The Marquis and Désirée are married; but at the wedding reception the Marquis seems uninterested, and Désirée, very much slighted, is furious. She sends her father to the Cardinal to request an annulment of her marriage.  Meanwhile, the Count escapes and returns to confront the Marquis. The Marquis reveals the full details of his plan to the Count, and to convince him his intentions are honorable, the Marquis sends his Sergeant with an immediate challenge to the Spanish General.

Surprising news arrives from the Cardinal; the rival whom the Marquis had killed was found to be a traitor, and the Marquis is thereupon not only pardoned but a hero. Alas, the Marquis has already obliged himself to conduct a one-man battle against the thirty-thousand Spaniards. With only his trusted sword in hand, the honorable Marquis departs, but not before he declares his love to Desiree.  The Marquis is not killed in the battle, and the tale of his unexpected victory is rousingly told by the Musketeers and Drummer-boys.

The victorious Marquis returns and is reunited with Désirée, but Pomaret arrives with the Cardinal's approval of Désirée's request for an annulment.  The Count neatly resolves this final glitch by tearing up the annulment paper and announcing that he is marrying Marie – now eligible to be his wife since she is now the cousin of a Marquis.  Pomaret also finds his match, the matron schoolmistress, Laurie, who it is rumored, has saved ten-thousand francs.  All ends happily.

Notable songs
The opera features many tuneful songs reminiscent of Gilbert and Sullivan as well as Sousa's trademark marches.  The true tour de force is the second act aria sung by Count de Courville, "The Sword, The Musket, and the Lance".

Sources
Bierley, Paul E. (2001). John Philip Sousa: American Phenomenon. Alfred Music Publishing. 
Traubner, Richard (August 1998) Recording review: Sousa: Desiree/El Capitan. Opera News

External links
The Works of John Philip Sousa

1884 operas
Compositions by John Philip Sousa
English-language operettas